Gabriel Sunday (born October 18, 1985) is an American actor and director, best known for portraying Archibald Holden Buster Williams in the teen comedy-drama film Archie's Final Project, and for directing and starring in the Daniel Johnston short film Hi, How Are You Daniel Johnston? as '1983 Daniel Johnston' alongside his modern day, real life counterpart.

Filmography

Film

Awards and nominations 
Sunday has been nominated for, and won, a number of awards.

References

External links 
 

1985 births
21st-century American male actors
American male film actors
Living people
Queer actors